Bukosh, is a village in the Vushtrri municipality in Kosovo. It is inhabited by a majority of ethnic Albanians.

History
Bukosh was first mentioned in the 1530 Ottoman defter, as a village in the Sanjak of Vučitrn. It was recorded in the 1566–1574 defter of the Sanjak of Vučitrn as well. It was included in an Austrian map based on data of 1689. It was recorded in the salname of the Kosovo Vilayet in the years 1893, 1896 and 1900.

Demographics

Evolution of the population

Business zone
The Vushtrri municipal assembly, during its session on March 27, 2008, decided to create a Business Zone (Industrial Zone) of common interest in the zone of Bukosh village with approximately surface area of 17.98.87 ha.

External links 
 Bukoš, fallingrain.com

References

Villages in Vushtrri